Tone Razinger (born 13 June 1921, date of death unknown) was a Slovenian cross-country skier. He competed in the men's 18 kilometre event at the 1948 Winter Olympics.

References

1921 births
Year of death missing
Slovenian male cross-country skiers
Slovenian male Nordic combined skiers
Olympic cross-country skiers of Yugoslavia
Olympic Nordic combined skiers of Yugoslavia
Cross-country skiers at the 1948 Winter Olympics
Nordic combined skiers at the 1948 Winter Olympics
Sportspeople from Jesenice, Jesenice